Crabtree Creek is a tributary of the Neuse River in central Wake County, North Carolina, United States. The creek begins in the town of Cary and flows through Morrisville, William B. Umstead State Park, and the northern sections of Raleigh (roughly along I-440) before emptying into the Neuse at Anderson Point Park, a large city park located in East Raleigh.

History

Lassiter Mill 
According to the City of Raleigh plaque at the site, one of Wake County's first mills was located on Crabtree Creek at a site known as "the Great Falls of Crabtree." The first mill was constructed before 1764, and the current foundations are remnants of a grist mill constructed by Cornelius Jesse Lassiter in 1908. The mill was destroyed by fire in 1958. Today, the Lassiter Mill site is a Raleigh City park, part of the greenway system, and is open to the public.

Flooding 
The creek lies within a flood plain that is historically prone to frequent flooding throughout its length, even after moderate rainfall. Construction of lakes on the creek and its tributaries to control floods have only partially alleviated this problem because rapid development of Wake County has greatly increased storm runoff. Crabtree Valley Mall derives its name from the creek; when the mall was constructed, the creek was redirected into an artificial channel behind the mall. At the time of construction there were predictions that the mall would flood. In fact, the new channel of the creek at the mall has proved to be inadequate for peak flows.

Tropical Storm Alberto (2006) caused the second highest elevation on record, ; and Hurricane Fran in September 1996 caused the third highest elevation, . All three events flooded the lower level of the mall, inundated the mall's parking lots, and obstructed traffic in the vicinity. Even moderate storms wreak minor havoc around the mall; for instance, a storm in June 2006 caused an evacuation of the mall and significant property damage.

The United States Geological Survey has a monitoring station on Crabtree Creek at highway 70 in Raleigh. The station's data goes enables better modeling and predictions of flooding.

Dams 
Numerous flood control dams have been built on Crabtree Creek.

In 1970, an earth dam was built in the Cary/Morrisville area. The U.S. Department of Agriculture Natural Resources Conservation Services (USDA NRCS) designed dam is 1,320 feet long and 45 feet tall. Originally called Crabtree Creek W/S Structure #3, the dam is now called the Fred G. Bond Dam because of its association with Bond Lake and the Fred G. Bond Metro Park in Cary. The dam was repaired during the winter between January 2016 and January 2020.

In the Cary/Morrisville area, the creek was dammed in 1988 to create Lake Crabtree, a  flood control lake. Lake Crabtree Dam or Crabtree W/S Structure #23 is an earth structure 1,200 feet long and 45 feet tall, designed by USDA NRCS. Lake Crabtree County Park, Raleigh's Crabtree Boulevard and Raleigh's Crabtree Park are all either named after the creek or the adjoining lake. The Crabtree Creek Trail, a branch of the Capital Area Greenway, follows the course of the creek from a location just west of Crabtree Valley Mall to the confluence with the Neuse River at Anderson Point Park.

Crabtree Creek Greenway
The Crabtree Creek greenway is a  paved trail that follows Crabtree Creek northwest from the Neuse River Trail beginning at Anderson Point Park to Lindsay Dr. The final  "east extension" section was completed in 2015 connecting the existing trail at Milburnie Road to the Neuse River Trail at Anderson Point Park. The city is planning a "west extension" (which will extend the 14.6 miles) to Umstead State Park.  That project's planning will take approximately 12 months to complete with construction beginning on 2021-10. The completed Crabtree Creek Trail will extend across the city, connecting numerous important areas and facilities: Umstead State Park, Crabtree Valley Mall, North Raleigh, Shelley Lake, Sertoma Park, Lassiter Mill, Kiwanis Park, and Anderson Point Park.

Watershed

Tributaries

References

External links
 Trails.com - Crabtree
 Wake Gov - Lake Crabtree
 Visit Raleigh - Lake Crabtree County Park Visitor Guide
 Realtime level at Crabtree Mall

Rivers of North Carolina
Rivers of Wake County, North Carolina
Tributaries of Pamlico Sound